Zachary Braiterman is an American philosopher, best known for writing on the topics of Holocaust theology, Jewish thought, aesthetics, and Jewish art. He is also a professor of religion at Syracuse University.

Education 
Braiterman received his B.A. from the University of Massachusetts at Amherst, Department of Near Eastern and Judaic Studies (1988), and his Ph.D. from Stanford University, Department of Religious Studies (1995).

Scholarship
Braiterman's scholarship on the role of theodicy in Holocaust theology has drawn responses from other theologians. In his 1998 book (God) After Auschwitz: Tradition and Change in Post-Holocaust Jewish Thought, he coined the term antitheodicy for a refusal to connect God with evil or a refusal to justify God. Dan Garner believed this philosophy "significantly advanced" the scholarship of Holocaust theology. Theologian and feminist scholar Melissa Raphael suggested that it could form the basis of a theology more focused on culture and community than concerns about the existence of evil, and literary theorist Brendan Cooper concluded that the concept could be applied in wider contexts, employing it for analysis of John Berryman's The Dream Songs.

Other scholars were more critical. Peter Admirand of the Mater Dei Institute of Education agreed with Braiterman's assessment of postmodernist influences on Jewish theology, but rejected the idea that theodic arguments concerning the Holocaust are required to "defend[] the indefensible." Sarah Pinnock criticized his definition of antitheodicy as unhelpful because it is overbroad, encompassing "any and all attempts to give religious meaning to evil and suffering".

Braiterman has also written extensively on the topic of Jewish art within the Jewish aniconic tradition. According to Martina Urban's review of his 2007 book The Shape of Revelation: Aesthetics and Modern Jewish Thought, he argues that religious revelation and visual art "do not constitute two radicually divergent discourses" because religion can inspire images indirectly in the same manner as expressionist painting. Raphael described him as connecting Jewish "aural" culture with visual media derived from Hellenic art traditions. Braiterman has also described the "deadening" of feeling in some Jewish art in the post-Holocaust era, such as in the works of Anselm Kiefer.

Employment
As of 2016, Braiterman is a professor of religion at Syracuse University. His paper in the journal Religious Education, discussing methods of teaching Jewish topics to a largely non-Jewish audience, received a critical response that argued he was taking too postmodernist and secular an approach to religious studies. In addition to his career in academia, Braiterman has written articles about religion and culture for The Daily Beast and Huffington Post.

Selected publications

Notes

References

External links
 Syracuse Faculty Page
 Jewish Philosophy Place

Bibliography

Living people
Year of birth missing (living people)
Syracuse University faculty
American Jewish theologians
Jewish American writers
Historians of Jews and Judaism
American historians of religion
University of Massachusetts Amherst alumni
Stanford University alumni
21st-century American Jews